Macusani is a town in Southern Peru, capital of the province Carabaya in the region Puno.

Geography

Climate 

Due to the extreme altitude, Macusani is a tundra climate and has very low temperatures, even during the warmest month of the year. According to Köppen and Geiger, this climate is classified as ET. The temperature here averages 5.0 °C. The rainfall  averages 726 mm.

References

Populated places in the Puno Region